Raidel Poey Romero (born February 20, 1982, in Havana) is a volleyball player from Cuba, who plays in different positions. He was named Most Valuable Player at the 2005 NORCECA Championship in Winnipeg, Manitoba, Canada, where Cuba ended up in second place. Now he plays for Libertas Cantù in Italy.

Individual awards
 2005 NORCECA Championship "Most Valuable Player"

References
 FIVB Profile

1982 births
Living people
Cuban men's volleyball players
Sportspeople from Havana